We Are: The Brooklyn Saints is a 2021 American docuseries created for Netflix and directed by Rudy Valdez. Its story follows the players, coaches and parents of the Brooklyn Saints, a youth football program in the east New York neighborhood of Brooklyn, throughout their 2019 season. The series was released on January 29, 2021.

Reception 
The series received a 91% approval rating on the review aggregator site Rotten Tomatoes.

References

External links 

2021 American television series debuts
2021 in American football
2020s American television series debuts
2020s American documentary television series
English-language Netflix original programming
Documentary television series about sports
Netflix original documentary television series